Diphyonyx is a genus of soil centipedes in the family Geophilidae found in the Palearctic region. They are notable for the unusually shaped claws on the anterior part of the trunk, which are swollen and have anterior spurs enlarged into elongate projections. Centipedes in this genus range from 4 cm to 6 cm in length and have 65 to 81 pairs of legs.

Etymology 
From Ancient Greek “diphyés” meaning "of double nature", and “ónyx, ónychos” meaning "claw", referring to the bipartite shape of the pretarsus of the legs on the anterior part of the trunk.

Species 
Species in this genus include:

 Diphyonyx conjungens Bonato, Zapparoli, & Minelli, 2008
 Diphyonyx garutti Bonato, Zapparoli, & Minelli, 2008
 Diphyonyx sukacevi Bonato, Zapparoli, & Minelli, 2008

References 

Geophilomorpha